Freeze is the tenth studio album by Dutch rock and roll and blues group Herman Brood & His Wild Romance. The album reached #63 on the Dutch album chart on 3 November 1990, and stayed on the chart for 5 weeks. Brood, who had just won the 1989 Popprijs, one of the highest Dutch awards for popular music, recorded Freeze with the help of Clarence Clemons of the E Street Band and Tejano accordion player Flaco Jiménez. Lack of success for this album leads Brood to stop touring.

Track listing

Personnel
Herman Brood and his Wild Romance
Herman Brood - piano, keyboards, vocals
Roy Bakkers - drums
Ivo Severijns - bass
David Hollestelle Jr. - guitar
with:
Clarence Clemons - saxophone
Flaco Jiménez - accordion
The Bombita's (Lies Schilp, Inge Bonthond, Robbie Schmitz, Perla den Boer) - backing vocals
Technical
Koos van Dijk - executive producer
John Tilly - engineer
Herman Brood - design
Alex de Groot - photography

References 

1990 albums
Herman Brood & His Wild Romance albums
CBS Records albums